is a former Japanese football player. He played for Japan national team.

Club career
Sugano was born in Aichi Prefecture on April 14, 1961. After graduating from Osaka University of Commerce, he joined his local club Toyota Motors (later Nagoya Grampus Eight). In 1992, Japan Soccer League was folded and founded new league J1 League. However, he retired in 1992 without playing in J1 League.

National team career
On February 2, 1988, Sugano debuted for Japan national team against Oman.

Club statistics

National team statistics

References

External links

Japan National Football Team Database

1961 births
Living people
Osaka University of Commerce alumni
Association football people from Aichi Prefecture
Japanese footballers
Japan international footballers
Japan Soccer League players
J1 League players
Nagoya Grampus players
Association football midfielders